Shyam is a name of Krishna and an Indian masculine given name and surname. Notable people with this name include:

Shyam
Shyam (actor), Indian Hindi film actor
Shyam (composer), an Indian music composer from Kerala
Shyam Benegal, Indian film director
Shyam Satardekar, Indian politician

Karam Shyam, Indian politician

Syam
Syam Pushkaran, scriptwriter in the Malayalam cinema
Syam Sudhakar (born 1983), Malayalam-language poet

See also
 Shyam (film), 2016 Indian Malayalam-language film
 Sam (given name)

Indian given names
Indian surnames